William Capewell (1878 – ?) was an English footballer who played in the Football League for Stoke.

Career
Capewell began playing football for his hometown club, Stoke in 1895 making his debut in the 1895–96 season. He left at the end of the season for Reading before returning to Stoke four years later in 1899. He was a regular in the side in 1900–01 and after making 62 appearances left in May 1902.

Career statistics

References

English footballers
Stoke City F.C. players
Reading F.C. players
English Football League players
1878 births
Year of death missing
Association football defenders